Keepin' in the Groove is the sixth studio album led by jazz pianist and mathematician Rob Schneiderman, released on the Reservoir label in 1996.

Reception

In his review on Jazz Times, Jack Sohmer stated "Were it not so well recorded and its date and personnel not indicated on the tray back it would be easy to believe that this session by pianist Schneiderman, bassist Rufus Reid, and drummer Akira Tana was discovered on an unissued tape from the mid-1950s. Indeed, the impression sustained throughout this date is that of a Bud Powell-inspired pianist playing his heart out in a small, unpretentious jazz club to the backing of a swinging rhythm team.

Track listing

Track listing adapted from AllMusic.

Credits

 Rufus Reid - Bass
 Akira Tana - Drums
 Rob Schneiderman - Piano, Liner notes
 B. Robert Johnson - Design, Photography
 Rudy Van Gelder - Engineer [Recording]
 Kayla Feldman - Executive-Producer
 Mark Feldman - Producer

References

Rob Schneiderman albums
1996 albums
Reservoir Records albums
Albums recorded at Van Gelder Studio